The 2021–22 season is Coventry City's 138th season in their history and the second consecutive season in the EFL Championship. It is also the first season back at the Coventry Building Society Arena after 2 seasons in Birmingham.  Alongside the Championship, the club will participate in the FA Cup and EFL Cup.

The season covers the period from 7 August 2021 to 29 May 2022.

Pre-season
Coventry City announced they would play friendlies against Sevilla, Cheltenham Town, Mansfield Town, Norwich City, Gloucester City, Wolverhampton Wanderers and Nuneaton Borough as part of their pre-season preparations.

Competitions

EFL Championship

League table

Results summary

Results by matchday

Matches
The Sky Blues fixtures were revealed on 24 June 2021.

FA Cup

Coventry City were drawn at home to Derby County in the third round.

EFL Cup

Coventry City were drawn at home to Northampton Town in the first round.

Birmingham Senior Cup

Coventry City were drawn away to AFC Wulfrunians in the first round.

Squad information

Squad details

* Player age and appearances/goals for the club as of beginning of 2021–22 season.

Appearances
Correct as of match played on 7 May 2022

Goalscorers
Correct as of match played on 7 May 2022

Assists
Correct as of match played on 7 May 2022

Yellow cards
Correct as of match played on 7 May 2022

Red cards
Correct as of match played on 7 May 2022

Captains
Correct as of match played on 7 May 2022

Penalties awarded

Suspensions served

International appearances

Monthly & weekly awards

End-of-season awards

Transfers

Transfers in

Loans in

Loans out

Transfers out

References

Coventry City
Coventry City F.C. seasons